Attorney General Jenkins may refer to:

Charles J. Jenkins (1805–1883), Attorney General of Georgia
Edward Enoch Jenkins (1895–1960), Attorney General of Fiji
Hugh S. Jenkins (1903–1976), Attorney General of Ohio

See also
General Jenkins (disambiguation)